Edward Montagu, 1st Earl of Sandwich, KG PC FRS JP (27 July 162528 May 1672) was an English military officer, politician and diplomat, who fought for the Parliamentarian army during the First English Civil War and was an MP at various times between 1645 and 1660. A loyal supporter of Oliver Cromwell, he was a member of the English Council of State from 1653 to 1659 and General at sea from 1656 to 1660. Following Cromwell's death in 1658, he switched allegiance and played an important role in the Restoration of Charles II in May 1660. 

Created Earl of Sandwich in July 1660, he served as Ambassador to Portugal from 1661 to 1662, then Spain from 1666 to 1668, when he negotiated the 1667 Treaty of Madrid. He commanded a naval squadron in the first part of the 1665 to 1667 Second Anglo-Dutch War, being relieved of his command in 1666 after a dispute over prize money. He returned to sea during the 1672 to 1674 Third Anglo-Dutch War and was killed at the Battle of Solebay in June 1672. 

Montagu is one of the best-known characters of the 1660s since he is a central figure in the diaries of Samuel Pepys, a distant cousin and naval official.

Personal details
Montagu was born on 25 July 1625, only surviving son of Sir Sidney Montagu ( 1572-1644) and his first wife Paulina Pepys (died 1638), great-aunt of Samuel Pepys. He was admitted as a student member of the Middle Temple in 1635. In 1642, his father remarried Anne Isham (died 1676), whom he described as "a religious, virtuous woman, as loving and contenting to me as my heart can desire".

On 7 November 1642, Montagu married Jemima Crew, daughter of John Crew, 1st Baron Crew and Jemima Waldegrave, whom Pepys in his Diary refers to with great affection as "My Lady". They had ten children in total; Jemima (1646–1671), Edward (1648–1688), Paulina (1649–1669), Sidney (1650–1727), Oliver (c. 1655–1689), John (c. 1655–1729), Charles (1658–1721), Anne (1660–1729) and Catherine (1661–1757). Paulina's death in February 1669, aged only twenty, was a great source of grief to her father: Pepys, who called her "a peevish lady", called to pay his condolences but found him "shut away for sorrow".

First English Civil War and the Interregnum

Although his father was a Royalist, when the First English Civil War began in August 1642 Montagu followed his Parliamentarian cousin the Earl of Manchester and served under him in the Eastern Association. He raised a regiment of infantry which during the 1644 campaign fought at Marston Moor, the Siege of York and Second Newbury. Despite his family relationship, Montagu supported those in Parliament who expressed dissatisfaction with the conduct of the war by Manchester and the Earl of Essex. 

This resulted in the creation of the New Model Army in February 1645 and the passing of the Self-denying Ordinance, requiring any of those holding military commissions to resign from Parliament. As members of the House of Lords, Manchester and Essex were automatically removed, since unlike MPs they could not resign their titles. Montagu's regiment was incorporated into the New Model, taking part in the June 1645 Battle of Naseby, followed by the capture of Bristol. In October, he resigned from the army as required by the Ordinance when was appointed MP for Huntingdonshire, a seat formerly held by his father who died in September 1644.

Montagu played no part in the Second English Civil War and retired from Parliament after Pride's Purge in December 1648 to live quietly at home. He returned to politics in 1653 when his neighbour Oliver Cromwell nominated him to the Barebones Parliament as MP for Huntingdonshire, a seat formerly held by his father who died in September 1644. He was also appointed to the English Council of State, an office he held until it was dissolved in 1659, and was re-elected to the First Protectorate Parliament in 1654, then the Second Protectorate Parliament in 1656. 

During the Anglo-Spanish War (1654–1660), he was appointed joint General at Sea with Robert Blake, taking part in an expedition into the Mediterranean. This experience made him a leading advocate of establishing a British naval base in the region, an ambition realised with the acquisition of English Tangier in 1661. In February 1657, he was one of the so-called "New Cromwellians" who supported the Humble Petition and Advice, inviting Cromwell to declare himself king and advocating the re-establishment of a national church. The measure was opposed by army radicals including Charles Fleetwood and John Lambert and ultimately rejected.    

In June 1658 he commanded the naval squadron that blockaded Dunkirk and when Cromwell died in September, Montagu remained loyal to his son and appointed successor Richard Cromwell. During his brief and disastrous rule as Lord Protector, Montagu remained at sea and in early 1659 was sent to mediate between Sweden and Denmark; however, he was suspected of secret communication with the exiled Charles II and the republicans Algernon Sidney and Sir Robert Honywood were sent to monitor his activity. He was recalled and investigated by the newly installed Rump Parliament; although no evidence was found, he was dismissed from command.

Restoration

By the end of 1659, England appeared to be drifting into anarchy, with widespread demands for new elections and an end to military rule. In February 1660, George Monck, military commander in Scotland, marched into London and declared his support for the Rump against the Republican faction led by John Lambert. Montagu resumed command of the navy and was returned as MP for the important port of Dover when elections were held for a Convention Parliament in April.  

This placed him in a powerful position during negotiations for the Restoration; when Parliament resolved to proclaim Charles king and invited him to return to England, Montagu commanded the fleet that brought him from the Dutch Republic on 24 May. Two months later, on 12 July 1660, he was created Baron Montagu of St Neots, Viscount Hinchingbrooke, and Earl of Sandwich. King Charles also made him a Knight of the Garter and appointed him Master of the Great Wardrobe, Admiral of the narrow seas (the English Channel and southern North Sea), and Lieutenant Admiral to The Duke of York, Lord High Admiral of England. He carried St. Edward's staff at Charles' subsequent coronation. Edward Hyde, 1st Earl of Clarendon, who liked and admired Sandwich, wrote that the conferring of these honours caused much resentment among those Royalists who had gone into exile with their King, and regarded Sandwich as a "diehard" Cromwellian; yet adds that his charm of manner made it almost impossible to dislike him.

He was appointed Ambassador to Portugal in 1661, and strongly favoured the Portuguese marriage, through which England obtained Mumbai and Tangier. Sandwich, like others, saw a great future for Tangier as an international trade centre, and he commanded the fleet which took possession of the city in January 1662, purchasing a house there. Returning to England, in his capacity as Ambassador, he escorted the new Queen, Catherine of Braganza, from Lisbon.

Montagu was a signatory to The Several Declarations of The Company of Royal Adventurers of England Trading into Africa, a document published in 1667 which led to the expansion of the Royal Africa Company.

The Prize Goods Scandal

In the Second Anglo-Dutch War of 1665 to 1667 he fought at the Battle of Lowestoft, an English victory, but defeat at the Battle of Vågen led to him being removed from active service. His reputation suffered another serious blow when he failed to prevent his sailors from plundering a number of Dutch VOC prize ships, loaded with precious spices from the East Indies, which he had brought in. By long-standing custom the sailors could take any goods they found between the decks, but they were strictly forbidden to "break the bulk" i.e. ransack the ship's hold; yet this is just what Sandwich, an easy-going man with a notoriously poor understanding of money matters, permitted. When this became widely known, the rumour spread that Sandwich had unlawfully helped himself to a fortune (in fact he seems to have taken less than he was entitled to), and the public, who were still enduring the horrors of the Great Plague of London, reacted with such unexpected fury that a minor mishap became a national affair: "the Prize Goods Scandal". Although Clarendon wrote that Sandwich was too likeable to have any personal enemies, he did have political opponents, including his own superior at the Admiralty, James, Duke of York, and James' influential secretary Sir William Coventry, who were happy to exploit the scandal. He felt obliged to obtain a royal pardon: the King, mindful of his good services at the Restoration, willingly granted it.

Ambassador to Spain
During his absence from battle, Sandwich served as England's ambassador to Spain, replacing Sir Richard Fanshawe. This is further evidence that despite his unpopularity, he retained the King's confidence, although his political fortunes, like those of his friend and patron Clarendon, were in decline. Sandwich himself had told Pepys the previous year not to put too much reliance on the friendship of any "great man". After the Great Fire of London Sandwich downplayed the damage to the Spanish King, claiming that London's slums were the only thing in ashes. This slant on the events was also practised by England's ambassadors throughout Europe.

As Ambassador his most notable achievement was the Anglo-Spanish Commercial Treaty of 1667, which laid the foundations for a prosperous trading relationship between the two countries which lasted for over a century. He also acted as mediator in the peace negotiations between Spain and Portugal which resulted in the Treaty of Lisbon. Like all Ambassadors of the era, he found the cost of running an embassy ruinous (he had never had a good head for business) and on his return to England in the autumn of 1668 one of his first actions was to borrow money from his cousin Samuel Pepys. On his way back from Spain, he again visited Tangier to report on the condition of the garrison there.

In 1670 he escorted the King's sister Henrietta of England, Duchess of Orleans, from France to England to negotiate the Secret Treaty of Dover between her brother and Louis XIV. Of the existence of the Treaty's secret clauses, notably that by which Charles II pledged to convert to the Roman Catholic faith, Sandwich, like the general public, was quite unaware. In the same year he was appointed President of the Privy Council Committee on Foreign Plantations; he had always had a keen interest in international trade, despite his notorious inability to keep his own finances in order.

Last campaign and death

He was subsequently reappointed to a naval command, and by 1672 at the start of the Third Anglo-Dutch War, he was Vice-Admiral of the Blue with the Royal James as his flagship. At the Battle of Solebay on 28 May, his ship was attacked by a group of fire ships and was destroyed with the loss of many lives, including Sandwich himself. His body was washed ashore a week later, recognisable only from his clothing; it was unmarked and he appeared to have drowned. Sandwich opposed the war and is said to have predicted his own death. Certainly, he told his friend John Evelyn, just before he sailed, that "he would see him no more".

On Wednesday 3 July 1672 he was buried in Westminster Abbey after a state funeral that started with a procession along the River Thames of five decorated barges from Deptford. The body was landed at Westminster at about 5 pm and carried to the Abbey in a grand procession.

Sandwich and Samuel Pepys
Sandwich on his mother's side was the first cousin of John Pepys, the father of Samuel Pepys. Pepys started his career as a minor member of the Sandwich household and owed his appointments first to the Wardrobe and then as Clerk of the Acts to the Navy Board to Sandwich's influence. Pepys' diary provides a detailed primary source of Sandwich's career in the 1660s.

They had a serious quarrel in 1663, when Pepys reprimanded Sandwich for living openly with his mistress, Elizabeth Becke, at her "mean house" in Chelsea. Pepys was concerned at the damage to their family's reputation, Sandwich's neglect of his official duties (thus risking the loss of any remaining influence he had at Court) and also at the insult to Sandwich's wife, to whom Pepys was deeply attached. Following a brief estrangement, friendly relations were resumed, although the two men were probably never as close again as they had been (Pepys, for example, is not mentioned in Sandwich's last will). For Pepys to raise the issue at all took considerable courage, considering how much he owed to his patron, and his Diary shows that he was strongly tempted to let the matter lie. Even when he did raise it he chose to write rather than confront Sandwich face to face.

In 1668 Pepys was somewhat perturbed when his wife Elizabeth, during one of the violent quarrels which followed the discovery of his affair with her companion Deb Willet, told him that Sandwich had asked her to be his mistress. Since Pepys was in no doubt that she had refused, he decided to treat the matter as being closed, and friendly relations continued: Sandwich dined at their house for the first time a few months later. Pepys, on reflection, may have thought it possible that Elizabeth in her anger had invented the story to upset him, (as she undoubtedly invented the story that she was attending Roman Catholic services). Whatever their differences, Pepys in later life always remembered Sandwich, whom he called "that noble and unparalleled Lord", and his wife (who died in 1674) with affection and gratitude.

References

Sources
 
 .
 
 
 
 
 
 
 
 
 
 

 London Gazette''' #691 Monday 1 July, to Thursday 4 July 1672
 The Journal of Edward Montagu, 1st Earl of Sandwich, admiral and general at sea, 1659-1665,'' edited by R.C. Anderson. Publications of the Navy Records Society, v. 64 (London, 1929).

External links
 
Biography of Edward Montagu, 1st Earl of Sandwich Civil Wars and Commonwealth website
The Electronic Calendar of the Carte Papers, 1660-87 The Carte Papers, held at the Bodleian Library, include correspondence of Edward Montagu, 1st Earl of Sandwich
Colonel Edward Montagu's Regiment of Foote A Part of the English Civil War Society, Re-enacting the wars between 1642 and 1649.

|-

|-

|-

1625 births
1672 deaths
English military personnel killed in action
Ambassadors of England to Portugal
Ambassadors of England to Spain
Knights of the Garter
Lord-Lieutenants of Huntingdonshire
Edward Montagu, 01st Earl of Sandwich
Montagu, Edward
Royal Navy admirals
17th-century English diplomats
17th-century Royal Navy personnel
Royal Navy personnel of the Second Anglo-Dutch War
Parliamentarian military personnel of the English Civil War
People in English Tangier
Earls of Sandwich
Members of the Parliament of England (pre-1707) for constituencies in Huntingdonshire
Royal Navy personnel of the Third Anglo-Dutch War
English justices of the peace
Members of the Privy Council of England
Military personnel from Northamptonshire
People from North Northamptonshire
Members of Cromwell's Other House